Douglas Ewart High School was opened in 1922 in Newton Stewart, Scotland.  It was formed by the amalgamation of the Douglas Free School opened in 1834 and the High School of the Ewart Institute opened in 1864.

The headteacher has been George Webb since 2019

Notable former pupils

Andrew Ayre, British High Commissioner to Guyana, 2011–15
John Dedman, member of the Australian Parliament
James A. Mirrlees, Nobel Prize winner
Kate Dickie, actress
Sir John McFadyean, pathologist

References

External links
Douglas Ewart High School website
Inspection reports
Douglas Ewart High School's page on Scottish Schools Online

Secondary schools in Dumfries and Galloway
1922 establishments in Scotland
Educational institutions established in 1922
Newton Stewart